Chenaq Bolagh (also Romanized as Chenāq Bolāgh; also known as Jenāq Bolāgh) is a village in Naqdi Rural District, Meshgin-e Sharqi District, Meshgin Shahr County, Ardabil Province, Iran. At the 2006 census, its population was 54, in 11 families.

References 

Tageo

Towns and villages in Meshgin Shahr County